Paul Bowman may refer to:
 Paul Bowman (rugby league) (born 1976), Australian rugby league footballer
 Paul Bowman-MacDonald, a fictional character from Monarch of the Glen
 Paul Bowman (academic), teacher at Cardiff University
Paul Bowman, 5th Baronet (1921–2003), of the Bowman baronets

See also
Bowman (disambiguation)